

History
The roots of the California Mathematics Project (CMP) can be traced to the Bay Area Writing Project (BAWP), a professional development project for teachers or writing. The BAWP was established in 1974 by James Grey at the University of California, Berkeley.

The CMP was created in 1982 by legislative act SB 424 (Carpenter) to "seek to solve the mathematics skills problem of students in California through cooperatively planned and funded efforts."
 At that time nine sites were funded throughout the state.  The University of California was vested with authority to manage and control the projects. The California Postsecondary Education Commission (CPEC) was to evaluate the projects. Judy Kysh was hired in 1984 as a part-time statewide coordinator. In 1986, it was decided that there needed to be a full-time statewide Executive Director to oversee the CMP.
In 1987, CPEC commissioned a policy study to analyze the effectiveness of professional development.

Following this report, in 1989 the California legislature created a professional development program expanding the structure of the California Writing Project (CWP) and CMP to embrace nine subject areas called the California Subject Matter Projects (CSMP).

Past coordinators and directors

Current sites
Sites "create a professional home for teachers that is based upon a culture of inquiry, experimentation, and reflections."

References

External links
 California Mathematics Project website
 California Mathematics Project at CSMP

1982 establishments in California
Organizations established in 1982
Educational organizations based in the United States
Education in California
Mathematics education in the United States
Mathematics organizations